Chicotortrix is a genus of moths belonging to the family Tortricidae containing only one species, Chicotortrix zeteles, which is known from Colombia.

See also
List of Tortricidae genera

References

 , 2005: World Catalogue of Insects vol. 5 Tortricidae.
 , 1987, Tinea 12 (Suppl): 123.

External links
tortricidae.com

Euliini
Tortricidae genera